The following lists events that happened during 2012 in the Republic of South Sudan.

Incumbents
 President: Salva Kiir Mayardit 
 Vice President: Riek Machar

Events

January
 January 1 - South Sudan is to send more troops and police to Pibor, the scene of ethnic violence.
 January 2 - Up to 50,000 people flee their homes in a border area of South Sudan amid ethnic violence.
 January 15 - South Sudan accuses neighboring Sudan of "stealing" its oil exports.
 January 20 - The United Nations says 120,000 people in South Sudan required aid amid tribal fighting.

February
 February 2 - The People's Republic of China asks for assistance from South Sudan to obtain the release of 29 Chinese workers held captive in Sudan for five days.
 February 11 - Sudan and South Sudan sign a non-aggression treaty.
 February 14 - A Sudanese air strike hits the South Sudanese state of Unity, injuring four soldiers in a contested area.

March

April

May

June

July

August

September
The presidents of both Sudan and South Sudan meet in Ethiopia, and after days of discussion, agree on trade, oil and security deals.

October

November

December

References

 
South Sudan
Years of the 21st century in South Sudan
2010s in South Sudan
South Sudan